Giant wheel is an alternative name for a large Ferris wheel.

Giant Wheel may also refer to:

Ferris wheels
 Giant Wheel (1982 World's Fair), a  Vekoma wheel
 Giant Wheel (Cedar Point), a  Anton Schwarzkopf wheel which opened in 1972 at Lake Erie, Sandusky, Ohio, US
 Giant Wheel (Darien Lake), a  Vekoma wheel
 Giant Wheel (Hersheypark), an Intamin double wheel which operated from 1973 until 2004 at Hershey, Pennsylvania, US
 Giant Wheel (Irvine Spectrum Center), in Irvine, California, US
 Giant Wheel (Morey's Piers), a  Vekoma wheel which opened in 1985 at Wildwood, Cape May County, New Jersey, US
 Giant Wheel (World Carnival), a Ronald Bussink Professional Rides transportable wheel operated by World Carnival, based in Hong Kong
 Vienna Giant Wheel (Wiener Riesenrad), a  wheel built in 1897 in Austria

Ferris wheel brand names
 Giant Wheel, jointly used by Ronald Bussink and Vekoma
 Giant Wheels, used by Fabbri Group

See also
 Giant Sky Wheel, a double wheel which operated from 1961 until 1980 at Cedar Point in Ohio, US
 Giant Star Wheel, a Ferris wheel in Pasay, Metro Manila, Philippines
 Great Wheel (disambiguation)